The Palmipède (from French, meaning web-toed) was an early steamboat created in 1774 by French nobleman, engineer and inventor Marquis Claude de Jouffroy. It was tested in June and July 1776 on the Doubs river between Besançon and Montbéliard and thus became the first steam-powered vessel. The boat was driven by a Newcomen steam engine and was the predecessor of the Pyroscaphe, also made by Jouffroy. It had a length of 13 m (42 ft). The steamboat was not considered a success due to its lower than desired speed, which led to the development of the first paddle steamer.

Specifications

The Palmipède was 13 m long and was equipped with a Newcomen steam engine which drove oars equipped with rotating, hinged flaps modeled on the webbed feet of waterfowl.

See also
List of boat types
List of historical ship types

References

Steamboats in Europe